The 2012 Tunis Open was a professional tennis tournament played on clay courts. It was the seventh edition of the tournament which was part of the 2012 ATP Challenger Tour and the Tretorn SERIE+ tour. It took place in Tunis, Tunisia between April 30 and May 6, 2012.

ATP entrants

Seeds

 1 Rankings are as of April 23, 2012.

Other entrants
The following players received wildcards into the singles main draw:
  Haithem Abid
  Marcel Granollers
  Skander Mansouri
  Lamine Ouahab

The following players received entry as a special exempt into the singles main draw:
  Mirza Bašić
  Vincent Millot

The following players received entry from the qualifying draw:
  Antonio Comporto
  Riccardo Ghedin
  Gianluca Naso
  Laurent Rochette

Champions

Singles

 Rubén Ramírez Hidalgo def.  Jérémy Chardy, 6–1, 6–4

Doubles

 Jerzy Janowicz /  Jürgen Zopp def.  Nicholas Monroe /  Simon Stadler, 7–6(7–1), 6–3

External links
Official Website

Tunis Open
Tunis Open